Kfarfalous, also spelled Kfar Falous   is a small village in the Jezzine District of the South Governorate of Lebanon, about 57 km  south of Beirut. Kfarfalous is known for being home to the unfinished now abandoned Kfarfalous University Complex.

History
In 1838, Eli Smith noted  Kefr Falus, as a village located in "Aklim et-Tuffah, adjacent to Seida".

Following the Israeli retreat after the 1982 invasion, Kfar Falous was  the village closest to Sidon in their self-declared security zone.

On 21 June 1990 members of the SLA clashed with fighters from NLA in Kfar Falous. The NLA were the dominant militia in Sidon. Four of their men were killed.

References

Bibliography

External links
Kfar Falous, localiban

Populated places in Jezzine District